Scott Tinsley (born November 14, 1959) is a former American football quarterback who played for one season in the National Football League for the Philadelphia Eagles in 1987. He was signed by the Los Angeles Rams as an undrafted free agent in 1984. He played college football at USC.

Professional career

Los Angeles Rams
Tinsley was signed by the Los Angeles Rams as an undrafted free agent following the 1984 NFL Draft. He was placed on the injured reserve list on August 21, 1984.

Philadelphia Eagles
Tinsley signed with the Philadelphia Eagles as a replacement player during the 1987 players strike. He played in 3 games and started 2.  The Eagles lost all 3 games played with replacement players.

References

1959 births
Living people
Sportspeople from Oklahoma City
Players of American football from Oklahoma
American football quarterbacks
USC Trojans football players
Los Angeles Rams players
Philadelphia Eagles players
National Football League replacement players